WMNC may refer to:

 WMNC (AM), a radio station (1430 AM) licensed to Morganton, North Carolina, United States
 WMNC-FM, a radio station (92.1 FM) licensed to Morganton, North Carolina, United States